Trirhabda canadensis, the goldenrod leaf beetle, is a species of leaf beetle in the family Chrysomelidae. It is found in North America.

References

Further reading

External links

 

Galerucinae
Articles created by Qbugbot
Beetles described in 1837
Taxa named by William Kirby (entomologist)